Old California City Hall and Fire Station is a historic city hall and fire station located at California, Moniteau County, Missouri.  It was built about 1892, and is a two-story, Italianate style red brick building.  It has two one-story brick additions.  It features decorative brickwork at the roof line, arched window and door openings and an ornamental cast iron balcony.

It was added to the National Register of Historic Places in 1982.

References

Government buildings on the National Register of Historic Places in Missouri
Italianate architecture in Missouri
City halls in Missouri
Government buildings completed in 1892
Buildings and structures in Moniteau County, Missouri
National Register of Historic Places in Moniteau County, Missouri
1892 establishments in Missouri
Fire stations on the National Register of Historic Places in Missouri